Lake Solina  is an artificial lake in the Bieszczady Mountains region, more precisely in Lesko County of the Subcarpathian Voivodship of Poland.

The lake was created in 1968 by the construction of the Solina Dam on the San River.

It is the best known tourist attraction of the region, with waterside villages like Solina, Myczkowce and Polańczyk catering to watersports enthusiasts. The lake's great depth, water clarity, and mountainous scenery makes it a very popular destination. The lake is also known as the Bieszczady Sea.

Starting in the 1970s the Wojewódzkie Przedsiębiorstwo Turystyczne (State Tourism Enterprise) "Bieszczady" purchased a number of vessels for the lake and established the lake's White Fleet. The fleet's main ships offer cruises on the lake.

External links

The Solina municipality website 

Solina
Lesko County
Solina